Mike Taylor (born George Mike Taylor on 15 August 1944) was an English cricketer. He was a left-handed batsman and a left-arm medium-pace bowler who played for Cheshire. He was born in Stockport, Cheshire.

Taylor, who represented Cheshire in the Minor Counties Championship between 1980 and 1982, made a single List A appearance for the team, during the 1981 NatWest Trophy, against Hampshire. From the upper-middle order, he scored 10 runs.

Taylor's son, Andrew Bond, played for Suffolk in the Minor Counties Championship between 1996 and 1997.

External links
Mike Taylor at CricketArchive 

1944 births
Living people
English cricketers
Cheshire cricketers
Sportspeople from Stockport